Hornblower Cruises & Events NOW City Experiences, more commonly known simply as Hornblower is a San Francisco-based charter yacht, dining cruise and ferry service company.

History
The company began in 1974 in Berkeley, California with two ships. In 1980 the original owner, Ward Proescher, sold the business to Terry MacRae and P. Michael Watson. Proescher later went on to start a competing charter yacht company in the Bay Area, Commodore Cruises.

By acquiring existing charter yacht companies, Hornblower was able to expand into San Diego in 1984, followed by Newport Beach in 1987. Shortly thereafter the company acquired the Marina del Rey-based Marina Cruise Lines.

By 1989 the company operated in Berkeley, San Francisco, San Diego, Newport Beach and Marina del Rey. The corporate headquarters were (and continue to be) located on the historic ferry Santa Rosa, which is moored at Pier 3 in San Francisco.

In 1992 Terry MacRae became the sole owner of Hornblower Yachts, Inc, which was rebranded as Hornblower Cruises & Events to more accurately reflect the products and services offered.

In 1996 Hornblower Marine Services (HMS) was created to fill a need as a consultant to the booming riverboat casino and ferry service operations industry. By 2003, HMS grew to 80 employees, with offices in San Francisco, New London, Boston and Jacksonville. Three year later, HMS had become the leading worldwide provider of high-speed ferry services.

In 2019 Hornblower Cruises & Events acquired Entertainment Cruises and all the operations encompassing it. The purchase of Entertainment Cruises doubled the number of ships and locations that Hornblower operates. In October of the same year, Hornblower acquired English tour boat operator City Cruises who have operations in London, Poole and York.

In 2022 Hornblower acquired Experience Australia Group Pty Ltd, a diversified tourism business based in Adelaide, South Australia, known mainly for operating Australian interstate experiential tourism trains (The Ghan, the Indian Pacific, The Overland, and the Great Southern) but also with interests in cruise and air tourism. In turn, the company had been owned by Quadrant Private Equity since 2016. In January 2022, Quadrant Private Equity sold the business to Hornblower.

Today, Hornblower operates out of 19 different ports: San Francisco, Berkeley, Sacramento, Marina Del Rey, Long Beach, Newport Beach, San Diego, DC, Alexandria, Boston, Chicago, Norfolk, Philadelphia, Toronto, Baltimore, Port of New York and New Jersey, London, Poole and York. The company's entire fleet now includes more than 80 boats.

Cruises and ferry services

Niagara Falls Cruises

Hornblower Canada Company, a Canadian subsidiary of Hornblower operates the Niagara Falls Gorge Boat Tour from the Canadian side of the Niagara River near Niagara Falls, similar to the Maid of the Mist cruises out of Niagara Falls, New York on the American side. Hornblower has two ships, Niagara Wonder and Niagara Thunder, which carries 700 passengers each. The boats are based on Elliot Bay Design Group design and built by Hike Metal Products of Wheatley, Ontario.

 Niagara Wonder
Years of service: 2013–present
Type: double-stack catamaran tour boat 
Engine: 2 x 450 BHP @1800RPM Scania DI13
 Niagara Thunder
Years of service: 2013–present
Type: double-stack catamaran tour boat
Engine: 2 x 450 BHP @1800RPM Scania DI13

Lake Tahoe Cruises
Between 1997 and 2002 Hornblower operated in Lake Tahoe, beginning with the acquisition of Lake Tahoe Cruises Inc. and the vessels Tahoe Queen and Tahoe Princess. Business expanded to include ferry service across Lake Tahoe and land shuttle services between South Lake Tahoe and Squaw Valley Ski Resort. Lake Link ferry service was launched across Lake Tahoe, and was the fastest passenger boat on the lake. In 2002 the Lake Tahoe port was sold to Aramark - the owner and operator of the MS Dixie - the primary long-standing competition for the Tahoe Queen.

Alcatraz Cruises

In 2006 Hornblower won the National Park Service concession for ferry service to Alcatraz Island when the contract with Blue & Gold Fleet expired. Under the name Alcatraz Cruises, the company provides ticketing service and transportation to the one and a half million visitors to the island every year.

In 2008, Alcatraz Cruises introduced the Hornblower Hybrid to the fleet — the first hybrid ferry in the United States. The Hybrid runs off of solar power, wind power, and low-emission diesel fuel.

Statue Cruises

In 2007 the company was awarded a concession from the National Park Service to operate ferries to Liberty Island and Ellis Island, the only public access to the national historic sites in the Port of New York and New Jersey. This replaced Circle Line, which had operated the service since 1953. Under the name Statue Cruises, the company provides ticketing service and transportation for visitors to the Statue of Liberty National Monument and Ellis Island Immigration Museum. Boats depart from either Communipaw Terminal, Liberty State Park in Jersey City or Castle Clinton, Battery Park in Lower Manhattan. All ferry riders are subject to security screening, similar to airport procedures, prior to boarding.

The affiliated Liberty Water Taxi operates between Liberty State Park and the Battery Park City Ferry Terminal.

Hornblower New York Cruises
Separately from its Liberty and Ellis Island service, Hornblower operates a fleet of six New York-based yachts operating from Pier 15 on the East River and Pier 40 on the Hudson River, offering scheduled sightseeing cruises and special-event charter excursions. Its vessels are the Hornblower Infinity, the Hornblower Serenity, the Hornblower Sensation, the Hornblower Hybrid, the Hornblower Esprit and the John James Audubon.

NYC Ferry

In 2015, Hornblower Cruises was selected to operate New York City's NYC Ferry service, which started operations on May 1, 2017. It is the company's first commuter ferry operation. One route connects Lower Manhattan and Midtown Manhattan with nearby points across the East River in northern Brooklyn and in Queens, while a second route connects Lower Manhattan with Rockaway Park in Queens. A third route, which began on June 1, 2017, connects Lower Manhattan with riverfront communities in southern Brooklyn. A fourth route, connecting Manhattan with Astoria, Queens, began operating on August 19, 2017. Two additional routes to Soundview, Bronx, and to the Lower East Side of Manhattan started operating in August 2018.

Notable yachts

The M/V Zumbrota, built for circus magnate Charles Ringling and named for the then-largest elephant in captivity, was acquired to serve guests in San Diego. It is now based in Marina del Rey.
The M/V Wild Goose (USS YMS-328) formerly John Wayne’s private yacht, joined the fleet in 1995. The vintage 1942 restored minesweeper continues to operate in Newport Beach.
The ferryboat Santa Rosa, which ferried passengers between San Francisco and the East Bay, now serves at the company’s corporate office. 
The M/V San Francisco Belle, a paddlewheel style vessel, joined the fleet in 2001. The Belle, with a capacity of 2,200 is the largest dining yacht on the West Coast.
The Hornblower Hybrid, the first hybrid ferry in the United States, was completed in 2008 and serves visitors to Alcatraz Island and Angel Island in San Francisco Bay.

Notes

References
Ramirez, Anthony (2007-06-29). "Circle Line Loses Pact for Ferries to Liberty Island". The New York Times. Retrieved 2009-11-03.
Nolte, Carl (2005-09-28). "Hornblower Yachts picked to operate ferries to Alcatraz". San Francisco Chronicle. Retrieved 2009-11-03.
Duxbury, Sarah (2009-10-16). "Hornblower’s landmark cruises power expansion". San Francisco Business Times. Retrieved 2009-11-03.

External links

Hornblower official website 
Alcatraz Cruises official website 
Statue Cruises official website 
Hornblower Marine Services official website
Hornblower Niagara Cruises
Entertainment Cruises official website

Ferry companies of California
Ferry companies of New Jersey
Ferry companies of New York (state)
Ferries of New Jersey
Ferries of New York City
Travel and holiday companies of the United States
Water transportation in New York City
Transportation in Hudson County, New Jersey
Port of New York and New Jersey
Public transportation in Los Angeles County, California
Public transportation in San Francisco
Companies based in San Francisco
Tourist attractions in Hudson County, New Jersey
Tourism in New Jersey
Tourism in New York City
Tourist attractions in the San Francisco Bay Area
1974 establishments in California
Statue of Liberty